Veronica is the largest genus in the flowering plant family Plantaginaceae, with about 500 species. It was formerly classified in the family Scrophulariaceae. Common names include speedwell, bird's eye, and gypsyweed.

Taxonomy for this genus is currently being reanalysed, with the genus Hebe and the related Australasian genera Derwentia, Detzneria, Chionohebe, Heliohebe, Leonohebe and Parahebe now included by many botanists. Monophyly of the genus is supported by nuclear ribosomal internal transcribed spacer (ITS) and cpDNA.
 
The taxa of the genus are herbaceous annuals or perennials, and also subshrubs, shrubs or small trees if Hebe is included. Most of the species are from the temperate Northern Hemisphere, though with some species from the Southern Hemisphere; Hebe is mostly from New Zealand.

Taxonomy
The genus name Veronica used in binomial nomenclature was chosen by Carl Linnaeus based on preexisting common usage of the name veronica in many European languages for plants in this group.  Such use in English is attested as early as 1572.  The name probably reflects a connection with Saint Veronica, whose Latin name is ultimately derived from Greek, Berenice.

Selected species

, Plants of the World Online listed about 460 accepted species and hybrids in the genus Veronica. This includes species formerly placed in the genus Hebe.

Veronica agrestis, green field-speedwell
Veronica alaskensis, Alaska speedwell
Veronica alpina, alpine speedwell
Veronica americana, American brooklime
Veronica anagallis-aquatica, water speedwell
Veronica aphylla, leafless stemmed speedwell
Veronica arcuata
Veronica arenaria
Veronica arvensis, wall speedwell
Veronica austriaca, Austrian speedwell
Veronica beccabunga, brooklime
Veronica bellidioides
Veronica besseya
Veronica bishopiana
Veronica bullii
Veronica calycina, cup speedwell
Veronica catarractae
Veronica catenata
Veronica chamaedrys, germander speedwell
Veronica cinerea
Veronica continua B.G.Briggs
Veronica copelandii
Veronica cusickii, Cusick's speedwell
Veronica cymbalaria, pale speedwell
Veronica dabneyi, Azores speedwell
Veronica derwentiana, Derwent speedwell
Veronica dillenii
Veronica diosmifolia
Veronica filiformis, slender speedwell
Veronica formosa
Veronica fruticans, rock speedwell
Veronica gentianoides, gentian speedwell
Veronica gracilis
Veronica hederifolia, ivy-leaved speedwell
Veronica incana, silver speedwell
Veronica japonensis
Veronica jovellanoides
Veronica liwanensis
Veronica longifolia, long-leaved speedwell
Veronica lyallii
Veronica mannii
Veronica missurica
Veronica montana, wood speedwell
Veronica nivea
Veronica obtusata
Veronica officinalis, heath speedwell
Veronica ovata
Veronica panormitana
Veronica peduncularis
Veronica peregrina, American speedwell
Veronica perfoliata, Digger's speedwell
Veronica persica, common field-speedwell
Veronica pimeleoides
Veronica pinguifolia
Veronica plebeia, creeping speedwell
Veronica polita, grey field speedwell
Veronica ponae
Veronica prostrata, sprawling speedwell
Veronica rakaiensis
Veronica regina-nivalis
Veronica repens, Corsican speedwell
Veronica salicifolia
Veronica scutellata, marsh speedwell
Veronica serpyllifolia, thyme-leaved speedwell
Veronica speciosa
Veronica spicata, spiked speedwell
Veronica stricta
Veronica strictissima
Veronica syriaca
Veronica topiaria
Veronica traversii
Veronica triphyllos, fingered speedwell
Veronica turrilliana
Veronica verna, spring speedwell
Veronica vernicosa
Veronica wormskjoldii, Wormskjold's speedwell

Uses

Food and medicine
Veronica americana is edible and nutritious, as are most species in the genus Veronica, and is reported to have a flavor similar to watercress.   The plant can be confused with skullcap and other members of the mint family. Members of the mint family have square sided stems, and Veronica species have rounded stems.

Veronica sp. herb has been used in the traditional Austrian medicine internally (as tea) for treatment of disorders of the nervous system, respiratory tract, cardiovascular system, and metabolism.

Ground cover
Several Veronica species and cultivars are cultivated for use as ground cover.

As weeds
Several species of speedwell are sometimes considered weeds in lawns. Some of the more common of these are Persian speedwell (V. persica), creeping speedwell (V. filiformis), corn speedwell (V. arvensis), germander speedwell (V. chamaedrys), and ivy-leaved speedwell (V. hederifolia). It is often difficult to tell one species from another. There are five to seven species of speedwell in Michigan alone that are easily confused.

Ecology
Species of Veronica are used as food plants by the larvae of some species of Lepidoptera, including the grizzled skipper.

An annual life history is known to have evolved separately several times within the genus, with up to 10% of the genus now having an annual life cycle. An annual life cycle, and associated morphological traits, is an adaptation thought to have developed in response to an extremely arid or generally unpredictable environment, and may persist in Veronica due to a historic concentration and radiation of members of the genus in and from the climatically volatile Balkan Peninsula.

References

External links
 
 
 
 

 
Plantaginaceae genera